Charles Thomas Wyke (born 6 December 1992) is an English professional footballer who plays as a forward for Championship club Wigan Athletic.

Career

Middlesbrough 
Wyke started his career in the academy at Middlesbrough and progressed through the system. After scoring close to 30 goals in the 2010–11 season in all competitions, he was rewarded with a three-year contract in May 2011.

Loan spells 
In March 2012, Wyke joined Football Conference side Kettering Town on a youth loan.

In October 2012, Wyke joined Football League One side Hartlepool United in a one-month loan deal. He made his professional debut on 9 October, in a Football League Trophy defeat to Bradford City on penalties where he scored in the shoot-out. After impressing for Pools, Wyke had his loan deal extended until the end of the season with boss John Hughes saying "I'm really pleased that we've been able to get things sorted because Charlie has done well in his time with us".

He then joined up with League Two side AFC Wimbledon on a months loan in January 2014, before having his deal extended by a further 3 months. He made 17 appearances for the Dons, netting two goals.

Wyke rejoined Hartlepool United on a one-month loan on 21 August 2014. The deal was later extended keeping him at Victoria Park until the end of November. He made 14 appearances in this second spell, scoring four times.

Carlisle United 
On 23 January 2015, Wyke signed for League Two side Carlisle United on an 18-month contract for an undisclosed fee following a successful spell at fellow League Two side Hartlepool, in which he netted 4 goals in 13 league appearances.

He scored his first goal in a Carlisle shirt on his full-home debut against fellow strugglers Mansfield Town, picking up an assist along the way in a 2–1 victory. Wyke followed up his impressive home-debut by netting a brace away at fellow strugglers Tranmere Rovers in a 2–0 victory. Wyke then followed up his impressive brace with his fourth goal in three starts against high-flyers Shrewsbury Town. During his first season at the club in 2015–16, he scored 15 goals in 38 appearances in all competitions.

On 28 January 2017, Wyke who had been in prolific form in the continuing season, scored his 18th goal of the 2016–17 season for Carlisle United against Barnet.

Bradford City 
Wyke signed for Bradford City for an undisclosed fee on transfer deadline day, 31 January 2017, alongside Jacob Hanson, Kevin Toner and Matthew Penney. Wyke took just 15 minutes to score on his debut for the club, scoring in a 2–2 draw at home to Gillingham four days later. He then scored a brace in another 2–2 draw later that month, this time at home to play-off rivals Bolton Wanderers.

Sunderland
For circa £400,000, Wyke signed for Sunderland on 1 August 2018. Due to a minor injury, his first goal for the club came exactly one month later when he was brought on as a substitute during a league game against Oxford United on 1 September 2018. After disappointing seasons in 2018–19 and 2019–20, where he combined for only 9 goals in 51 total league appearances, he became the centerpiece of the Sunderland attack in the 2020–21 season. He scored his first goal of the campaign in a 2–0 win over Swindon Town on 17 October. He had his first multi-goal match of the season in the league on 12 December with two goals in a 4–0 win over Lincoln City. His form only improved as he scored 15 times in 15 league matches between 2 January and 6 March, during which he crossed the 20 goal mark in the league. In Sunderland's EFL Trophy run, he scored five goals in six appearances, not only putting himself in a tie as top goalscorer for the competition but also helping lead the club to the final. 

Following an impressive season, Wyke was named in the 2020–21 EFL League One Team of the Season at the league's annual awards ceremony. On 18 May 2021, he was named Sunderland Player of the Year.

Wigan Athletic
On 7 July 2021, Wigan Athletic completed the signing of Wyke on a three-year deal. He scored his first goals for Wigan when he scored twice in a 4-1 win at Accrington Stanley on 18 September 2021. In November 2021, Wyke collapsed in training during the build-up to a League One fixture with Cambridge United. On 25 November, two days after the match, the club issued a statement that Wyke was in a stable condition in hospital where he would continue to be monitored.

Career statistics

Honours
Sunderland
 EFL Trophy: 2020–21; runner-up: 2018–19

Individual
PFA Team of the Year: 2020–21 League One
EFL League One Team of the Season: 2020–21
 Sunderland Player of the Year: 2020–21

References

External links 

1992 births
Living people
English footballers
Association football forwards
Middlesbrough F.C. players
Kettering Town F.C. players
Hartlepool United F.C. players
AFC Wimbledon players
Carlisle United F.C. players
Bradford City A.F.C. players
Sunderland A.F.C. players
Wigan Athletic F.C. players
National League (English football) players
English Football League players